Pill Hill is a name for neighborhoods in several cities, usually ones that contain a hospital. It may refer to:

Pill Hill, Brookline, Massachusetts
Pill Hill, Atlanta
Pill Hill, Cincinnati
Pill Hill, Oakland, California
Pill Hill, Rochester, Minnesota
Pill Hill, San Diego, California
Pill Hill, Chicago
Marquam Hill, Portland, Oregon, also called Pill Hill
First Hill, Seattle, colloquially called Pill Hill due to the presence of three major hospitals

It may also refer to 
Pill Hill (play) a play set in Pill Hill, Chicago